Morgen und Abend (German: Morning and Evening) is an opera by Georg Friedrich Haas to a libretto by the Norwegian writer Jon Fosse. It is based on Fosse's 2000 novel Morgon og kveld.

The opera was jointly commissioned by the Royal Opera House, London, and the Deutsche Oper Berlin. It was premiered on the main stage of the Royal Opera House on 13 November 2015. The director of the production is Graham Vick.

The composer has said "'Don't expect melodies, don't expect harmonies, just expect soundscapes". The vocal lines include microtones,  including quarter-tones and sixth-tones.

Roles

Synopsis
The opera, which lasts about 90 minutes, outlines the birth and death of a fisherman, Johannes. In the first section, Johannes's father Ollai waits for his birth, imagining  what his wife and the child are experiencing, until the Nurse announces the birth has been successful and invites him to see the child. In the next section Johannes meditates on his child Signe and speaks with his friend Peter and his wife Erna, but eventually realizes that as the latter two have long since died, he himself must also be dead.

Critical reaction
Richard Morrison, writing in The Times, opined that although the piece was slow to develop "By the end...I felt I was watching a very weird masterpiece". Rupert Christiansen, writing in The Daily Telegraph found the work "hypnotically beautiful yet turgidly tedious...Yet Haas’s music casts a spell...it moves like Scandinavian weather – clouds scudding, mists thickening, wind keening, thunderclaps crashing – through a glacial landscape of shimmering microtonal sound that is both precisely calibrated and eerily atmospheric". Tim Ashley, in The Guardian, felt that "beautiful though it sounds, it is weak as drama".

References
Notes

Sources
Morrison, Richard (2015). Thrilling ride from womb to tomb, in The Times arts section, p. 11, November 16 2015.
Shipman, Chris (2015). Georg Friedrich Haas on Morgen und Abend — 'Don't expect harmonies... in Royal Opera house website, accessed 24 October 2015.

Operas
Operas based on novels
German-language operas
Operas set in fictional, mythological and folkloric settings
2015 operas
Opera world premieres at the Royal Opera House